Knorre is a surname. Notable people with the surname include:

Ernst Friedrich Knorre (1759–1810), German-born astronomer and professor of mathematics who lived and worked in present-day Estonia
Karl Friedrich Knorre (1801–1883), son of Ernst Friedrich, Russian astronomer of German ethnic origin
Viktor Knorre (1840–1919), son of Karl Friedrich, Russian astronomer of German ethnic origin
Dmitrii Knorre (born 1926), Russian chemist and biochemist